Fernando Bustos Castañeda (1 August 1944 – 23 September 1979) was a Mexican footballer who competed in the 1968 Summer Olympics.

Death
Bustos died in a car accident on the road to Querétaro in 1979, aged just 35.

Legacy
Bustos was inducted into Salón de la Fama del futbol in Pachuca on November 13, 2018.

Honours 
Cruz Azul
 UEFA-CONCACAF Cup: 1969 
 CONCACAF Champions' Cup: 1969, 1970, 1971
 Mexican Primera División: 1968–69, México 1970, 1971-72, 1972-73, 1973-74, 1978-79
 Mexican Segunda División: 1963-64
 Copa México: 1968–69
 Campeón de Campeones: 1969, 1973
 Campeonísimo: 1969
National team
 CONCACAF Championship: 1971

Notes

References

External links

1944 births
1979 deaths
Footballers from Mexico City
Association football midfielders
Olympic footballers of Mexico
Footballers at the 1968 Summer Olympics
Pan American Games medalists in football
Pan American Games gold medalists for Mexico
Liga MX players
Cruz Azul footballers
Atlético Español footballers
Road incident deaths in Mexico
Footballers at the 1967 Pan American Games
Medalists at the 1967 Pan American Games
Mexican footballers